Hir (also Romanized as Hīr) is a village in West Alamut District, Qazvin County, Qazvin Province, Iran. At the 2006 census, its population was 2500, in 450 families.

Lambsar fortress is close by.

References 

Populated places in Qazvin County